Pentalenolactone D synthase (penE (gene), pntE (gene)) is an enzyme with systematic name 1-deoxy-11-oxopentalenate,NADH:oxygen oxidoreductase (pentalenolactone-D forming). This enzyme catalyses the following chemical reaction

 1-deoxy-11-oxopentalenate + NADPH + H+ + O2  pentalenolactone D + NADP+ + H2O

Pentalenolactone D synthase is a FAD-dependent oxygenase.

References

External links 
 

EC 1.14.13